Sex and the City 2 is a 2010 American romantic comedy film written, co-produced, and directed by Michael Patrick King. It is the sequel to the 2008 film Sex and the City, based on the 1998–2004 television series. Sarah Jessica Parker, Kim Cattrall, Kristin Davis, and Cynthia Nixon reprised their roles as friends Carrie, Samantha, Charlotte, and Miranda, while Chris Noth co-stars as Carrie's husband Mr. Big. It features cameos from Liza Minnelli, Miley Cyrus, Tim Gunn, Ron White, Omid Djalili, Penélope Cruz, Norm Lewis, and Kelli O'Hara.

Sex and the City 2 was released theatrically on May 27, 2010, in the United States and the following day in the United Kingdom. It was panned by critics but was a commercial success grossing $294 million on a $95 million production budget.

A sequel television series, titled And Just Like That..., premiered on HBO Max in 2021.

Plot
Carrie, Samantha, Charlotte, and Miranda attend the wedding of their friends Stanford and Anthony. Three of the four women are now married themselves but Samantha, aged 52, is desperately trying to keep her libido alive as she enters menopause. The wedding is officiated by Liza Minnelli who also performs a musical number, and Carrie serves as Stanford's "best man". Back home, Miranda quits her job after her firm's misogynistic new managing partner disrespects her once too often. Charlotte's two children are a handful, mostly her two-year-old daughter Rose's extreme and constant crying, and she is worried that her husband Harry is attracted to their buxom Irish nanny, Erin. Carrie's marriage to Mr. Big has settled down, although they differ on how to spend their spare time. Carrie wants to go out often to dinner, parties and big events, whereas Big prefers to stay in and relax on the couch.

For their anniversary, Carrie gives Big a vintage Rolex watch engraved with the message "Me and You, Just Us Two" while he, much to her dismay, shows her a new TV in their bedroom as his gift, which Big says they can use to watch old films together, something they did at the hotel at Anthony and Stanford's wedding and seemed to enjoy. She is disappointed with Big's gift, as she had hoped for something more personal to show he realizes they must maintain the spark in the marriage. However, Big starts to watch TV more often, making Carrie feel unappreciated. In response she stays at her old apartment for two days to write an article, after which Big acts the way he did while they were first dating and they both enjoy a romantic night out. He enjoys it so much he suggests to Carrie that they take two days off every week, he can go somewhere for those two days to relax, watch TV and lie on the couch, and the rest of the time he will have more energy to do what she wants to do. Carrie does not dismiss this, but is hurt by the suggestion and worries it means they will drift apart.

Meanwhile, Samantha is to devise a PR campaign for an Arab sheikh's business. He flies her and her friends on an all-expenses-paid luxury vacation to Abu Dhabi. Carrie is happy she will have time to think about Big's suggestion. Charlotte is worried about leaving her husband alone with the nanny. But Miranda, unfettered by a job for the first time in her life, is especially excited. Upon entering Abu Dhabi, Samantha's hormone-enhancing drugs are confiscated under United Arab Emirates law, rendering her devoid of estrogen and hindering her libido. Charlotte tries to call Harry every few minutes; Miranda revels in the culture surrounding her; and Carrie befriends her manservant, Gaurau, who is an underpaid temporary worker from India. He warns Carrie of men with watches trying to take advantage of her.

On a visit to a local souq (market), Carrie runs into her former lover, Aidan. He proposes dinner à deux at his hotel, and she accepts. The dinner is very enjoyable, with the two discussing old times. Aidan remarks on the ways Carrie is "not like other women". In a moment of remembered passion, they kiss. Carrie runs away in panic and returns to her hotel, where Miranda and Charlotte are having drinks together and discussing the difficulties of motherhood. When Carrie wonders whether she should tell Big about the kiss, as they have no secrets between them, Miranda reflects on when her husband Steve told her about his affair. Samantha counsels Carrie to wait before deciding anything. Carrie opts to call Big to tell him. Big is silent upon hearing the news, and after saying a few words, hangs up.

The four women find their Western style and attitudes clash with Muslim customs. For example, while on a date with a handsome Danish architect, Samantha is arrested for public display of affection after fondling him at a restaurant, giving him an erection in public and making out with him on the beach. With the Sheikh's intervention, Samantha is released but is left with a permanent police record. To make matters worse, the Sheikh cancels the PR meeting and ceases paying for the remainder of the women's luxurious stay. They quickly pack their bags and leave, but must return to the souq to find Carrie's passport that she accidentally left there when she ran into Aidan. When Charlotte is conned into going into a building to buy fake goods, Carrie, Samantha and Miranda save her. However one of the men chase after them and rips Samantha's purse, causing condoms to fall on the ground. When Samantha's liberal dress and western attitude incites an outraged mob among the local men, the women are rescued by a group of local Emirati women who share their sense of style hidden underneath their customary black robes. The Emirati women help to disguise the four American women in robes and veils so they can escape and make it to the airport in time.

When Carrie returns home, she finds the bedroom TV removed and Big gone. She passes an anxious day, at the end of which he returns. Big tells her that although he was torn, he realizes that what she needs is something to remind her at all times that she is married. He hands her a jewelry box, which reveals an engagement ring set with a black diamond. When Carrie asks him why a black diamond, he says she is not like anyone else, echoing Aidan's earlier comment, showing he does appreciate her and they have not lost their spark.

Big and Carrie combine their interests; Charlotte's nanny, Erin, turns out to be a lesbian and no threat to her marriage; Miranda finds a new job at a more laid-back and diverse law firm where she is appreciated; and Samantha remains unchanged, and even meets for sex on the beach with the Danish architect, this time in the Hamptons.

Cast
 Sarah Jessica Parker as Carrie Bradshaw / Preston
 Kim Cattrall as Samantha Jones
 Kristin Davis as Charlotte York Goldenblatt
 Cynthia Nixon as Miranda Hobbes
 Chris Noth as John James "Mr. Big" Preston
 John Corbett as Aidan Shaw
 David Eigenberg as Steve Brady
 Evan Handler as Harry Goldenblatt
 Jason Lewis as Jerry "Smith" Jerrod
 Willie Garson as Stanford Blatch
 Mario Cantone as Anthony Marentino
 Lynn Cohen as Magda
 Alice Eve as Erin, Charlotte's Irish Nanny
 Noah Mills as Nicky Marentino
 Megan Boone as Allie
 Max Ryan as Rikard Spirt
 Raza Jaffrey as Gaurau
 Viola Harris as Gloria Blatch
 Omid Djalili as Mr. Safir, Hotel Manager
 Dhaffer L'Abidine as Mahmud
 Art Malik as Sheikh Khaled
 Penélope Cruz as Carmen García Carrión
 Andrew Rannells as Wedding Chorus
 Liza Minnelli as herself
 Miley Cyrus as herself
 Tuesday Knight as herself
 Tim Gunn as himself

Production

Development
After months of speculation, the cast confirmed in February 2009 that a sequel was in the works. Filming began in August 2009.

The sequel is noticeably different from its predecessor and includes more exotic locales than the original. King credits this to the experience he had promoting the original film in such locales. He was also inspired by the recession to write something bigger more akin to the extravagant adventures and escapist comedies of the 1930s. The location of Abu Dhabi was chosen because of its high fashion culture (although the authorities later revoked filming clearance) and also that it was a location relatively free from the recession.

All four stars, Sarah Jessica Parker, Cynthia Nixon, Kristin Davis, and Kim Cattrall, returned in the sequel; Chris Noth also signed on to reprise the role of Mr. Big. Evan Handler returned as Harry Goldenblatt, John Corbett as Aidan Shaw, David Eigenberg played Steve Brady once more, Willie Garson returned as Stanford Blatch, and Mario Cantone again played Anthony Marentino, making the original cast almost complete. In addition, Michael Patrick King wrote and directed again, and Patricia Field once again took charge of the costumes and wardrobe. Hats were once again created by Prudence Millinery for Vivienne Westwood.

Entertainment Weekly confirmed that the budget for the film was US$95 million, exactly $30 million greater than the budget for the first film. Sarah Jessica Parker was paid US$15 million plus residuals for her dual role as a producer and starring as Carrie Bradshaw.

Filming
Filming in New York City was postponed to the end of July as Emirati authorities refused clearance for filming in the United Arab Emirates. Consequently, the Abu Dhabi segment of the film was filmed in Morocco. All four leading actresses and other cast and crew were photographed filming scenes in Morocco in November 2009, where they had originally planned to shoot for 13 days, which had to be extended to almost six weeks. Filming took place at several locations including the seaside town of Sidi Kaouki.

The sequel officially began filming on September 1, 2009 and continued until the end of the year.

Casting
In September 2009, American singer and actress Liza Minnelli confirmed to several media outlets that she appeared in a cameo role. Singer and actress Bette Midler had been photographed on set, but does not appear in the film. Penélope Cruz appears briefly as Carmen, a banker. Miley Cyrus appeared in one scene where she appears at the premiere of Smith Jerrod's new film, wearing the same dress as Samantha. On October 17, Oceanup.com posted several pictures of Cyrus filming the scene.

John Corbett was seen on location in Morocco, confirming his speculated involvement in the film as Aidan.

Release
Promotion began in December 2009, when the official teaser poster was released online, featuring Carrie in a white dress and gold sunglasses which reflect a Moroccan backdrop, and the tagline "Carrie On", a similar pun of the lead character's name as "Get Carried Away" from the first film. The same image and tagline was used for the launch of the official Sex and the City 2 website, also launched in December 2009.

The teaser trailer premiered online on December 22, 2009. In March 2010, Sarah Jessica Parker, Kristin Davis and Cynthia Nixon attended ShoWest 2010 in Las Vegas to premiere the full length trailer and discuss the film (Kim Cattrall was in London performing on stage in the West End, and joined the rest of the cast for promotion when her stage run ended on May 3).

The full theatrical trailer premiered on Entertainment Tonight and online on April 8, 2010, featuring the New York City-themed single "Empire State of Mind" by Jay-Z and Alicia Keys, as well as Australian singer Ricki-Lee Coulter's song "Can't Touch It".

A full-scale promotional tour with all key cast members—including television, press conference and print—commenced in early May 2010, and continued throughout the film's release, encompassing many different countries and cities. The New York City premiere of the film was held on May 24, 2010.

Reception

Critical response

Rotten Tomatoes, a review aggregator, reports that 15% of 220 critics have given Sex and the City 2 a positive review; the average rating is 3.90/10. By comparison the first film received a score of 49% based on 183 reviews and has an average score of 5.70/10. The critical consensus is: "Straining under a thin plot stretched to its limit by a bloated running time, Sex and the City 2 adds an unfortunate coda to the long-running HBO series." Metacritic gave the film a score of 27/100 based on a normalized average of 39 reviews indicating generally unfavorable reviews.

The film was criticized for its portrayal of the Middle East. Stephen Farber of The Hollywood Reporter called it "blatantly anti-Muslim" and Hadley Freeman of the UK broadsheet The Guardian described the trailers as "borderline racist". Andrew O'Hagan of the London Evening Standard wrote that the film "could be the most stupid, the most racist, the most polluting and women-hating film of the year". Roger Ebert gave the film one star out of four; he wrote that the characters are "flyweight bubbleheads" and the visual style "arthritic", and criticized the voiceover narration as redundant.

Lindy West wrote a noted review of the film, saying that "SATC2 takes everything that I hold dear as a woman and as a human—working hard, contributing to society, not being an entitled cunt like it's my job—and rapes it to death with a stiletto that costs more than my car. It is 146 minutes long, which means that I entered the theater in the bloom of youth and emerged with a family of field mice living in my long, white mustache. This is an entirely inappropriate length for what is essentially a home video of gay men playing with giant Barbie dolls."

Toronto academic Mitu Sengupta said the film exploited women's and gay rights and "pitifully" turned them into "badges of national honor" and "smug patriotic pride". She wrote: "What's really worrying about Sex and the City 2 is not its Orientalism or crass materialism, but how easily this seemingly benign bubble-gum flick ends up fighting a very macho war of global one-upmanship on the bodies of women and gay men." British critic Mark Kermode declared it the worst film of 2010, saying he could think of nothing "more poisonous, more repugnant, more repulsive, more retrograde, more depressing than Sex and the City 2". Time named it one of the 10 worst movies based on TV shows.

Sex and the City 2 received seven nominations at the 31st Golden Raspberry Awards, including Worst Picture. It went on to win three awards, including a joint Worst Actress award for the four “gal pals” (Parker, Cattrall, Nixon, and Davis). David Eigenberg expressed interest in receiving the Worst Couple/Screen Ensemble Razzie, which was awarded to the entire cast. According to Razzies founder John J. B. Wilson, "[Eigenberg] said that he had never won an award of any kind and if this was what he won, he would accept it." Eigenberg then collaborated with Wilson to make a humorous acceptance video which was posted on the official YouTube channel of the Golden Raspberry Awards.

In 2015, comedians Tim Batt and Guy Montgomery watched the film every week for a full year for the second season of their podcast, The Worst Idea of All Time.

Box office
Sex and the City 2 opened in 3,445 theaters on May 27, 2010, setting a record for one of the widest release for a R-rated romantic comedy film. Playing in 2,000 theaters, the film grossed $3 million from its midnight premiere. On its opening day, the film topped the box office grossing $14.2 million, for a projected $60 million for a four-day opening weekend, plus $75 million for a five-day Memorial day weekend. But it debuted in second place behind Shrek Forever After with $31 million, and its total to $45.2 million, for its four-day opening weekend, plus $51 million on its five-day opening weekend (Memorial Day).

Internationally, the sequel topped the charts in Germany for five weeks, the United Kingdom for three weeks, Australia for two weeks and exceeding the original in Japan and Greece. Sex and the City 2 sold more tickets than the first part in many other markets. As of August 19, 2010, the film's total US gross stands at $95.3 million. As of August 1, 2010, internationally it has grossed $199.3 million—giving it a worldwide total of $294.7 million. Although 27% lower than the first film, it was 2010's highest-grossing romantic comedy.

Home media
Sex and the City 2 was released on DVD, Blu-ray, and iTunes on October 26, 2010, in the US where it entered the chart at number one selling almost one million copies in its first week. It was released on DVD and Blu-ray in the UK on November 29, 2010, also entering the sales chart at number one.

Soundtrack

Sex and the City 2: Original Motion Picture Soundtrack was released on May 25, 2010, by WaterTower Music.

The score was recorded and mixed by Dennis S. Sands and Steve Kempster and performed by a large ensemble of the Hollywood Studio Symphony conducted by Stephen Coleman who orchestrated Aaron Zigman's score. Patrick Kirst also orchestrated.

Track listing

Notes
  signifies an additional producer

Sample credits
 "Rapture" and "Divas and Dunes" contain elements of "Sex and the City" by Douglas Cuomo.
 "Empire State of Mind (Part II) Broken Down" contains a sample of "Love on a Two-Way Street" by The Moments.

Not included on the soundtrack
 "Songs Remind Me of You" by Annie appears in the background of the afterparty scene, but is not included on the soundtrack.
 "Empire State of Mind" by Jay-Z featuring Alicia Keys appears in the background of the Smith's film premiere scene, and official trailer, but is not included on the soundtrack.

Charts

Cancelled sequel and follow-up television series

In December 2016, Radar Online reported that a script for the third film had been approved. However, on September 28, 2017, Sarah Jessica Parker confirmed that the third film was not going to happen. She said, "We had this beautiful, funny, heartbreaking,
joyful, very relatable script and story. It's not just disappointing that we don't get to tell the story and have that experience, but more so for that audience that has been so vocal in wanting another movie." It was reported in 2018 that Kim Cattrall did not want to appear in the film when she learned of the storylines involving killing off Mr. Big and Samantha receiving sexting and nude pictures from Miranda's 14-year-old son, Brady. Cattrall later clarified in 2019 that she opted not to appear in a third film, explaining she "went past the finish line" portraying the character of Samantha because of her love for the franchise.

The third movie plot was later readapted as the 2021 television series And Just Like That..., with Cattrall not returning, as agreed. The series premiered on HBO Max on December 9, 2021. Originally billed as a miniseries, it was renewed for a second season in March 2022.

Awards and nominations

References

External links

 
 
 
 
 
 

Sex and the City
2010 films
2010 LGBT-related films
2010 romantic comedy-drama films
2010s American films
2010s buddy comedy-drama films
2010s English-language films
2010s female buddy films
2010s sex comedy films
American buddy comedy-drama films
American female buddy films
American LGBT-related films
American romantic comedy-drama films
American sequel films
American sex comedy films
Films about fashion in the United States
Films about weddings in the United States
Films based on television series
Films directed by Michael Patrick King
Films scored by Aaron Zigman
Films set in Manhattan
Films set in the United Arab Emirates
Films shot in Morocco
Films shot in New York City
Golden Raspberry Award winning films
HBO Films films
LGBT-related romantic comedy-drama films
LGBT-related sex comedy films
Liza Minnelli soundtracks
New Line Cinema films
Village Roadshow Pictures films
Warner Bros. films